John R. Lukacs (born March 1, 1947) is an American anthropologist. He received a PhD  in 1977 from Cornell University, where he was a student of Kenneth A.R. Kennedy. Lukacs is a professor in the Department of Anthropology at the University of Oregon in Eugene.

His research focuses on physical anthropology, dental evolution, paleopathology and dental anthropology. He has worked extensively on health and human adaptation in the prehistory of South Asia. Much of this work focuses on odontometrics, dental morphology, tooth development and pathology. He has also performed dental anthropological analyses on hominin ancestors and non-human primates, particularly concerning an enamel defect named Localized Hypoplasia of the Primary Canines).

References

1947 births
American anthropologists
American paleoanthropologists
Cornell University alumni
Living people
Paleopathologists
University of Oregon faculty